The Direction centrale de la police aux frontières (DCPAF) is a directorate of the French National Police that is responsible for border control at certain border crossing points in France. 

It was established in 1973 as police de l'air et des frontières. On 29 January 1999, it was given its current name, and its existing organisational character was determined in 2011.

It works alongside its British counterpart, the UK Border Force, at the juxtaposed controls in Calais and along the Channel Tunnel Rail Link; and at the Port of Dover with Kent Police and Port of Dover Police.

Since 1995, Customs have replaced the Border Police in carrying out immigration control at smaller border checkpoints, in particular at maritime ports and regional airports.

Organisation
DCPAF is headed by a central director assisted by a deputy central director and includes 2 different commands:
A central command, consisting of a staff, support services, and 3 sub-directorates;
A territorial command, made up of DCPAF's zonal directorates.

DCPAF has 10,088 agents as of January 1, 2013.

Central Command
The central command of DCPAF, headed by a central director and senior police officers from the design and management body, is composed of:
A staff,
Irregular immigration and territorial services sub-directorate, to which is attached the Central Office for the Suppression of Irregular Immigration and the Employment of Untitled Foreigners (OCRIEST) which coordinates and animates the activity deployed by the investigative units (mobile research brigades - BMR) of the decentralised services,
a Resources Branch,
a sub-directorate for cross-border international affairs and security, in particular responsible for monitoring relations with the European Border and Coast Guard Agency (FRONTEX),
the National Railway Police Service.

Territorial Command
The DCPAF extends its action throughout the national territory of France and overseas through a territorial network based on 7 zonal directorates (DZPAF North, DZPAF East, DZPAF South East, DZPAF South, DZPAF South West, DZPAF West, DZPAF Antilles-Guyane), 2 airport directorates (Charles De Gaulle Airport/ Paris–Le Bourget Airport), 4 directorates (DPAF New Caledonia, French Polynesia, St Pierre and Miquelon and Mayotte), 45 departmental directorates (DDPAF), 7 railway brigades, 7 poles of analysis and operational management, 10 brigades of aeronautical police. 15 administrative detention centers are controlled by the DCPAF.

See also
List of border crossing points in France
Schengen Area
Juxtaposed controls

References

National Police (France)
Immigration to France